The Dudinská Päťdesiatka or Dudinská 50 (Fifty kilometres of Dudince) is an annual racewalking competition held in March on the streets of Dudince, Slovakia. The primary focus of the competition is a men's 50 kilometres race walk, from which the event takes its name. There are also two 20 kilometres race walks, one for men and one for women, as well as a variety of shorter races for younger athletes.

It holds permit meeting status from the European Athletic Association and is part of the annual IAAF World Race Walking Challenge circuit. The races attract high level international competition, including from China. The race has played host to the European Race Walking Cup on three occasions (1998, 2001 and 2013) – more than any other city. On top of these international events, the Dudince 50 km race has hosted the Slovakian national championships on numerous occasions and was also the venue for the Hungarian and Ukrainian national championships in 2000. The competition enjoys strong support from the city and the president of the organising committee is the Mayor of Dudince, PaedDr. Dušan Strieborný.

The race has been the site of several records, including a French record of 3:38:45 hours by Yohann Diniz in 2009, a Slovakian record of 3:34:38 hours by Matej Tóth in 2015, and an Irish record of 3:51:32 hours in 2008 by Colin Griffin.

Past winners
Key:

Men's 50km and women's 20km walk

Men's and women's 35km walk

Men's & women's 20km walk

References

List of winners
WINNERS OF THE DUDINSKA 50 IN WALKING. Dudince Walking. Retrieved 23 March 2014.

Racewalking competitions
Recurring sporting events established in 1982
Tourist attractions in Banská Bystrica Region
Athletics competitions in Slovakia
1982 establishments in Czechoslovakia
Annual sporting events in Slovakia
Sport in Banská Bystrica Region
Spring (season) events in Slovakia